A special election was held in Maine's at-large congressional district on November 7, 1820, to fill a vacancy left by the resignation of John Holmes.  Holmes had been elected under the authority of the State of Massachusetts to that state's former , part of the District of Maine.  When, on March 15, 1820, the former District was granted statehood as the State of Maine, Holmes was elected one of its first two Senators.  Under the act admitting Maine as a state, seven seats were moved from Massachusetts to Maine for the 17th Congress, and any vacancies in the 16th Congress that arose in seats held by residents of Maine were to be filled by residents of the new state.

The special election was held on the same date as the general elections for the 17th Congress.

Election results

Dane took his seat on December 11, 1820

See also
 List of special elections to the United States House of Representatives
 1820 and 1821 United States House of Representatives elections
 List of United States representatives from Maine

References

1820 01
Maine 1820 01
Maine 01
Maine 01
United States House of Representatives 01
United States House of Representatives 1820 at-large